Francesc Orella i Pinell (born 11 June 1957) is a Spanish actor of cinema, television, theater and dubbing mainly known for his title role in the series Merlí on TVC.

In 2008, Orella won a Max award for Best Actor for his role in An Enemy of the People. In June 2009, he was awarded the National Theatre performance "strong, unique, compelling, moving and flawless" in theater productions of all records.

Biography 
Born in Barcelona in 1957, he graduated from the Institut del Teatre in his hometown, and later moved to the United States to study at the Herbert Berghoff Studio (HB Studio) in New York City where he studied with actors such as John Strasberg, Carol Rosenfeld, Carlos Gandolfo, Genadi Karatkov and Bob McAndrew.

In the world of the cinema made debut in several films and series produced by TV3, until in the year 2000 made debut in the Commissary, of Telecinco.

He later appeared in series and mini-series as Ventdelplà (2009) or Infieles (2009), and debuted as co-star in Las veus del Pamano (2009), Ermessenda (2010) and  Prim, l'assassinat del carrer del Turco (2014). In 2015 he joined the cast of the new series Carlos, Rey Emperador where he gave life to Cardinal Adrian of Utrecht.

In the middle of 2015 he got the starring role of "Merlí" in TVC's TV series Merlí, which made him famous both nationally and internationally. He plays a professor of Philosophy who encourages his students to think freely through unorthodox methods, a man who has a seductive and intense sex life.

Personal life 
He currently resides in Valldoreix, in the municipality of Sant Cugat del Vallès (Spain). He is single without children.

Filmography

Cinema

Television

References

External links 
 

1957 births
Living people
Male actors from Catalonia